Michail Makarow (born 13 January 1984) is a German bobsledder who has competed since 2004. His best World Cup finish was first in the four-man event at Calgary in December 2010.

References

1984 births
Living people
German male bobsledders